Sason andamanicum is a species of spider in the family Barychelidae, found in the Andaman Islands.

References

Barychelidae
Spiders of Asia
Spiders described in 1888